This is a list of stations of the Kochi Metro. There are 25 stations planned on the line from Aluva to Tripunithura railway station 24 of them are currently in operation as of September 1, 2022.

Stations

Operational

References

External links

 Official website
 Metromap.in - Data of all Metro Trains, Stations in India, With HD Route Map and Stations List.

Kochi
Kochi Metro stations
Kochi-related lists